Chepauk-Thiruvallikeni State Assembly constituency is one of the 234 state legislative assembly constituencies in Tamil Nadu state in southern India. Its State Assembly Constituency number is 19. It is also one of the 6 state legislative assembly constituencies included in the Chennai Central Lok Sabha constituency.

Overview
As per orders of the Delimitation Commission, No. 19 Chepauk-Thiruvalikeni Assembly constituency is composed of Ward 79,81-93,95 & 111 of Greater Chennai Corporation

List of members of legislative assembly

Election results

2021

2016

2011

References

Assembly constituencies of Tamil Nadu
Politics of Chennai
Constituencies established in 2011
2011 establishments in Tamil Nadu